Noce Blanche is a 1989 French romantic drama film written and directed by Jean-Claude Brisseau. It stars Vanessa Paradis, Bruno Cremer and Ludmila Mikaël, with François Négret, Jean Dasté and Véronique Silver.

Plot
The moody 17-year-old Mathilde has lived separated from her parents. Her philosophy teacher, François, happens to stumble across her path and is eager to help her learn more. He starts to come over to her house every day to go over her homework and teach her the art of studying. Eventually, Mathilde starts placing little hints that she finds François attractive. He tries to resist her, but he finds himself falling for her as well. They soon blossom into a passionate love and keep their affair a secret from his wife, Catherine, and the school.

Catherine later finds out about the affair when her husband comes home late and Mathilde calls his house until he answers. Mathilde becomes obsessed and jealous of Catherine, sends her messages and breaks the glass windows in her bookshop. Catherine tries desperately to find a solution to it. Soon, she gives François an ultimatum to choose between her and Mathilde. He understands the consequences of his decision and ends the affair.

Mathilde starts a relationship with a classmate in an attempt to make François jealous. One day, after Mathilde's friends have smashed the windows of Catherine's shop, an angry François drags Mathilde out of his class and seeks an explanation from her. Soon he cools down and the two share a passionate kiss. However, a group of pupils happen to see them through a window. Later, François is fired and Mathilde is expelled from school.

After Catherine decides to divorce François, he moves to Dunkirk and starts teaching there. A year later, he receives a phone call from the police informing him that Mathilde is dead. He comes to see the body and is shocked by the death of his true love. It turns out that Mathilde had rented an apartment two months earlier next to his school, where she had a perfect view of his classroom. She had lived as a recluse and sat all day looking out of the window. She died of yearning.

François goes to sit on the beach, watches the ocean and remembers Mathilde's last words, written on her apartment wall; "There's the ocean, François". The meaning of that phrase refers to her mother's suicide note in which she said that she felt like she "was merging with the ocean", the mother's last words.

Cast
 Vanessa Paradis as Mathilde Tessier
 Bruno Cremer as François Hainaut
 Ludmila Mikaël as Catherine Hainaut
  as Carpentier
 Jean Dasté as concierge
 Véronique Silver as school counselor
 Philippe Tuin as supervisor

Production
During the investigation that preceded the 2005 trial of Jean-Claude Brisseau for sexual harassment of some actresses, Vanessa Paradis' mother reported "an incident" during the shooting of the film, which was released in 1989. Brisseau had asked the actress, who was a minor, to masturbate in front of him and his companion. The very young actress conditioned the continuation of the film to the constant presence of her mother during the filming.

Noce Blanche marked the acting debut of the 16-year-old Paradis. According to the photographer Pierre Terrasson, Brisseau made Paradis rehearse 14 hours a day: "She often cried. It was morally difficult [for her]."

Awards and nominations
César Awards (France) 
Won: Most Promising Actress (Vanessa Paradis)
Nominated: Best Actress – Supporting Role (Ludmila Mikaël)
Nominated: Best Poster (Dominique Bouchard)

References

External links
 
 

1989 films
1989 romantic drama films
1980s French-language films
1980s high school films
1980s teen drama films
1980s teen romance films
Adultery in films
Films about scandalous teacher–student relationships
Films directed by Jean-Claude Brisseau
Films set in France
Films shot in France
French high school films
French romantic drama films
French teen drama films
1980s French films